The Hundred of Stirling is a Hundred of the County of Buckingham (South Australia), centered on Keith, South Australia, South east of Adelaide, South Australia.

It is in the Tatiara District Council Area.

References

Stirling